Dan or Daniel Allen may refer to:

Dan Allen (American football) (1956–2004), American college football coach
Dan Allen (comedian) (born 1973), American stand-up comedian
Dan Allen (gambler) (1832–1884), pioneer gambler in Omaha, Nebraska

See also

Danny Allen-Page (born 1983), English footballer
Danny Allan (born 1989), English rugby league player
Allen (surname)